SBE (SamyBoy Entertainment)   is a privately held lifestyle hospitality company. SBE owns and operates over 20 hotels, 70 restaurants, and 42 lounges, and shares its headquarters between Los Angeles, New York City, and Miami.

History 
SBE was established in 2002 by founder and CEO Sam Nazarian. SBE's established and upcoming hotel brands include SLS Hotel & Residences, Delano, Mondrian, Redbury, Hyde Hotel & Residences, Clift, Hudson, Sanderson and St Martins Lane.

In November 2016, SBE acquired Morgans Hotel Group adding 13 boutique hotels to its portfolio, including New York's Hudson, the Mondrian and Delano brands, as well as Morgans Originals. Although Morgans was a public company, SBE acquired it in a "take-private" transaction, and therefore, SBE continues to be a private company.

In June 2020 all of SBE's hotel holdings were sold to Accor. In the same Month, SBE founded C3 by SBE, a ghost kitchen startup.

Management 
Nazarian holds majority ownership of SBE, and remains its founder and CEO, leading day-to-day operations. In 2020, The SLS Hotels were sold to Accor and are currently operated under its Ennismore brand.

SBE's former partners include designers Philippe Starck, Yabu Pushelburg, KPF, and Marcel Wanders, photographers David Rockwell and Matthew Rolston, and chefs Dani Garcia, Katsuya Uechi, Michael Schwartz, musician and actor Lenny Kravitz, and Danny Elmaleh. SBE also has partnerships with certain credits cards and vendors.

Disruptive Restaurant Group
A subsidiary of SBE, Disruptive Restaurant Group, incubates and operates culinary brands. The restaurants include Katsuya, Hyde, KUMI, Casa Dani and Life Rooftop.

Nightlife & restaurants

Las Vegas:
 S Bar
 Citizens Kitchen 
 KUMI

Los Angeles:
 Katsuya Brentwood
 Katsuya Hollywood
 Katsuya LA Live
 Hyde Sunset Kitchen and Cocktails
 Hyde Crypto
 Nightingale Plaza
 The Doheny Room

New York:
 Katsuya 
 Casa Dani
 KUMI

Partnerships
In addition to SBE's above-mentioned partners, SBE has entered partnerships to offer programs such as:
 Programs for holders of credit cards that participate in Chase's Luxury Hotel & Resort Collection, in the sbe+Chase Sapphire Reserve partnership, and in the Visa Signature Hotels collection for Visa Signature and Visa Infinite cardholders 
 "Exclusive sbe Hotel Perks for Sprint customers".

Former

The Abbey
The Abbey is a bar and nightclub in West Hollywood, California. Originally established as a local coffee shop in 1991 by David Cooley, the bar was eventually purchased by SBE. It is one of the highest tax revenue producing businesses in West Hollywood, California.

The Abbey was featured in television series of interest to the LGBT community, including serving as the venue of the Logo original series Wisecrack. The club and its owner, David Cooley, featured in the Logo series Open Bar and Jacob and Joshua: Nemesis Rising and the TV series The Janice Dickinson Modeling Agency. Transgender actress Candis Cayne was featured in several lip-synch shows there in 2008.

Model and dancer Steven Dehler is a regular performer at The Abbey.

In late summer 2015, David Cooley repurchased his establishment from SBE. SBE no longer owns or has a controlling interest in the Abbey Food and Bar.

References

External links
 

2002 establishments in California
Companies based in Los Angeles
Entertainment companies established in 2002
Hospitality companies established in 2002
Real estate companies established in 2002
Entertainment companies of the United States
Hospitality companies of the United States
Real estate companies of the United States
Nazarian family
West Hollywood, California